Soco, SOCO, or SoCo may refer to:

Organizations
 Saskatchewan Opportunities Corporation, a provincial crown corporation in Saskatchewan, Canada
 Society for Community Organization, a non-governmental and human rights advocacy group in Hong Kong
 SOCO International, an oil and gas exploration and production company, headquartered in London
 SoCo Music Project, a community music organization based in Southampton, England

Places
 South Coast (Massachusetts), the coast of Massachusetts and Rhode Island
 Soco Gap, a mountain pass in North Carolina, United States
 Soco River, Dominican Republic
 Socos District, Huamanga province, Peru
 South Congress, Austin, Texas, United States
 Sokho, an ancient town in Israel or the West Bank

Other uses
 S.O.C.O. (Scene of the Crime Operatives), a reality public service program in the Philippines
 "Soco" (song), by Starboy, featuring Wizkid, Terri, Spotless and Ceeza Milli
 Chaco socos, a spider of family Nemesiidae
 Scenes of crime officer, an officer who gathers forensic evidence for the British police
 Scene of the Crime Operations, the forensic arm of the Philippine National Police
 Soco Monument, a monument in East Java, Indonesia
 Something Corporate, an American rock band. 
 Southern Comfort, an American liqueur.